Cembalea is a genus of African jumping spiders that was first described by Wanda Wesołowska in 1993.

Species
 it contains five species, found only in Africa:
Cembalea affinis Rollard & Wesolowska, 2002 – Guinea
Cembalea heteropogon (Simon, 1910) – Namibia
Cembalea hirsuta Wesolowska, 2011 – Namibia
Cembalea pulmosa (Lessert, 1925) (type) – Kenya, Tanzania, South Africa
Cembalea triloris Haddad & Wesolowska, 2011 – Namibia, South Africa

References

Salticidae genera
Salticidae
Spiders of Africa
Taxa named by Wanda Weso%C5%82owska
Taxa named by Wanda Wesołowska